Balkans campaign may refer to:

 Alexander's Balkan campaign
 Balkans campaign (World War I)
 Balkans campaign (World War II)
 Maurice's Balkan campaigns